Lago Verde (Italian for "green lake") is a lake which is located  in Italy, close to the French border and the Queyras valley.

Lakes of Piedmont